The Sentence Is Death is a 2019 mystery novel by British author Anthony Horowitz and the second novel in the Hawthorne and Horowitz series. The story focuses on solving the murder of a teetotaling solicitor who was murdered with an expensive bottle of wine.

Synopsis 
Anthony, the narrator, is once again approached by ex-Detective Inspector Daniel Hawthorne and asked to write about him and a case he is working on, despite the fact that their first collaboration has not been published yet. Although Anthony is not too keen on Hawthorne, the details of the case pique him and he reluctantly agrees to document the case.

Reception 
The Sentence Is Death received positive reviews in NPR, NY Journal of Books, and Kirkus Reviews.

References

External links 
 

2019 British novels
British mystery novels
Novels by Anthony Horowitz
Century (imprint) books